FWN may refer to:

 Fund for Wild Nature, non-governmental organization working for the preservation of wild nature
 Favourite Worst Nightmare, album by Sheffield indie rock band Arctic Monkeys
 Sussex Airport (New Jersey), small general aviation airport located in Sussex, New Jersey, United States
 Friedrich Wilhelm Nietzsche, philosopher